"Reckless" (aka "Reckless (Don't Be So)", "Reckless (Don't You Be So)", "She Don't Like That") is a 1983 song from the EP Semantics by Australian band Australian Crawl. The song showed a change in the line up of the band as drummer Bill McDonough was temporarily replaced by Graham Bidstrup (also on keyboards). After the EP was released, Bidstrup was replaced by John Watson (drums).

The EP Semantics charted on the Australian Singles Charts to reach #1 and consequently some sources list "Reckless" as a #1 single. It was written by lead singer and guitarist James Reyne. Listeners of Triple M voted "Reckless" the 39th best song of all time in 2007; it was the highest placed Australian Crawl song.

The song's lyrics refer to locations in Sydney such as Manly and Circular Quay.

In Europe (including the United Kingdom) "Reckless" was released by Geffen Records as a single backed with "White Limbo"; it was also a track on the 1984 expanded LP version of Semantics.

Australian Crawl performed "Reckless" as one of their three songs for the Oz for Africa concert (1985).  This was the Australian leg of the global Live Aid show organised by Midge Ure and Bob Geldof. The "Oz for Africa" concert was broadcast on MTV, but only performances by Australian band INXS were placed on the 20th Anniversary DVD collection.

Cover versions
Fellow Australian artists Paul Kelly and the Coloured Girls performed "Reckless" for their 1988 double single EP release of Dumb Things, it was later credited to Paul Kelly and the Messengers for the 1992 CD Hidden Things.

During his solo career, Reyne recorded a different version of "Reckless" for Electric Digger Dandy (aka Any Day Above Ground) in 1991. He still performs the song during live concerts.

John Farnham covered the song for his 2005 covers album I Remember When I Was Young, he also covered the Crawl's song "Downhearted".

Melbourne-based DJs / producers, Smash N Grab, released "She Don't Like That" in 2005 with re-recorded vocals by James Reyne. The CD single had three versions: a radio edit, an extended edit and a club mix.

Misheard lyric
Readers of lyrics websites have suggested the line in the song about "A Russian sub beneath the Arctic" is a mondegreen in which "sub" has often been transcribed wrongly as "sun".

Track listing
European Single
 "Reckless (Don't You Be So)" (James Reyne) - 5:23 
 "White Limbo" (Simon Binks) - 4:03

Personnel

Australian Crawl
 James Reyne — lead vocals, keyboards, guitar 
 Simon Binks — lead guitar 
 Paul "Tubbs" Williams — bass guitar
 Guy McDonough — backing vocals, rhythm guitar 
 Brad Robinson — rhythm guitar
 Graham "Buzz" Bidstrup  — drums, keyboards

Additional credits
 Andrew Thompson — saxophone  
 Rosemary Westbrook — double bass on "Reckless"
 Engineer — David Nicholas
 Producer — Mark Opitz

Charts

Weekly charts

Year-end charts

Certifications

References

Australian Crawl songs
1983 songs
APRA Award winners
Number-one singles in Australia
Songs about Australia
Songs written by James Reyne
Song recordings produced by Mark Opitz